La Garita is a district of the La Cruz canton, in the Guanacaste province of Costa Rica. It is located in the north of the country, near the Nicaraguan border.

Geography 
La Garita has an area of  km² and an elevation of  metres.

Villages
Administrative center of the district is the village of Garita.

Other villages in the district are Agua Muerta, Andes, Asilo, Cañita, Carmen, Fortuna, Guapinol, Inocentes, Lavaderos, Pochote, San Antonio and Tapezco.

Demographics 

For the 2011 census, La Garita had a population of  inhabitants.

Transportation

Road transportation 
The district is covered by the following road routes:
 National Route 4

References 

Districts of Guanacaste Province
Populated places in Guanacaste Province